Jonathan Sadowski (born November 23, 1979) is an American actor. He is best known for his starring role as Josh Xander Kaminski on the Freeform sitcom Young & Hungry (2014–18). He also starred as Henry Goodson in CBS sitcom $#*! My Dad Says (2010–11).  

Sadowski had roles as Paul Antonio in the romantic comedy film She's The Man (2006), Trey in the action film Live Free or Die Hard (2007), Wade in the horror film Friday the 13th (2009), and Blake in the comedy film The Goods: Live Hard, Sell Hard (2009).

Early life
Sadowski was born on November 23, 1979, in Chicago, Illinois, the son of Marirose and Robert Sadowski.

Career
Sadowski first rose to prominence in 2006, with his starring role as Viola Hasting's best friend, Paul Antonio, in the romantic comedy film She's The Man. He subsequently had roles as Trey in the 2007 action thriller Live Free or Die Hard, Wade in the 2009 horror film Friday the 13th, Blake in the 2009 comedy film The Goods: Live Hard, Sell Hard, Paul in the 2012 disaster horror film Chernobyl Diaries, and Hemingway in the 2017 drama film Axis.

Sadowski also had numerous guest starring role in television series, such as NCIS, House, and Chuck. He starred as Henry Goodson in CBS comedy series $#*! My Dad Says (2010–2011). 
Sadowski gained further recognition for his starring role as Josh Xander Kaminski on the Freeform sitcom Young & Hungry, which aired from 2014 to 2018. He also assumed the role of Devon in Sex Life, which aired in 2021.

Filmography

Film

Television

References

External links
 
 Jonathan Sadowski's video interview with The Futon Critic
 Instagram

1979 births
Living people
Male actors from Chicago
American male film actors
American male television actors
American people of Polish descent
21st-century American male actors
American people of Italian descent